Nouria Hernandez is a Swiss biologist and the rector of the University of Lausanne (since 1 August 2016). She was professor of molecular biology at the University of Lausanne from 2004 to 2016.

Life and career 

Nouria Hernandez studied at the University of Geneva (diploma in 1980) and received a doctorate from the University of Heidelberg (in 1983). From 1983 to 1986, she then worked at the Yale University. In 1987, she was nominated group leader at the Cold Spring Harbor Laboratory and, in 1988, became professor at the Watson School of Biological Sciences.

In 2004, she moved to Europe and became professor at the University of Lausanne where, between 2005 and 2014, she was also director of the Centre for Integrative Genomics. In 2007, she received the Cloëtta Prize. Between 2008 and 2014, Nouria Hernandez was also a member of the central committee of the Swiss Academy of Natural Sciences.

Rector of the University of Lausanne 
In August 2015, after being selected by a vote of the University Council (by 26 votes out of 39) in June, the Council of State of Vaud nominated Nouria Hernandez as rector of the University of Lausanne from 1 August 2016. She is the first woman to lead the University of Lausanne.

As rector, one of her priorities will be to promote the theme of "viable development" (with the idea of survival in the long term of the next generations). She sees viable development as an interdisciplinary subject of reflection involving not only technology but also biology, ecology, philosophy, economy and politics.

References

External links 
  Official page (University of Lausanne)

University of Lausanne
Swiss biologists
Living people
Rectors of universities in Switzerland
Academic staff of the University of Lausanne
Yale University faculty
1957 births
Women heads of universities and colleges
20th-century biologists
20th-century Swiss scientists
20th-century women scientists
21st-century biologists
21st-century Swiss scientists
21st-century women scientists
University of Geneva alumni
Heidelberg University alumni